Magham Down Manor House is a Grade II listed building in Magham Down in the Wealden district of East Sussex.

External links
 Entry on Historic England
 Entry on britishlistedbuildings.co.uk

Manor houses in England
Grade II listed buildings in East Sussex